The Park Place Gallery was a contemporary cooperative art gallery, in operation from 1963 to 1967, and was located in New York City. The Park Place Gallery was a notable as a post-World War II gallery for both its location and that it supported a group of artists working with geometric abstraction and space.

It is thought of as being the first gallery of the 1960s in that area of Lower Manhattan. Park Place Gallery was located at 542 West Broadway, adjacent to the neighborhood that is now called, SoHo. Originally opened as a cooperative gallery in 1963 near Park Place in Lower Manhattan, in 1965 it moved to a new and larger location at 542 West Broadway. The gallery was a large open exhibition space with an office and second showing space in the back. In general there were two-person exhibitions each featuring a painter and a sculptor in the larger front room, and a small selection of artists work in the back room.  

The first director of Park Place Gallery was John Gibson who later opened his own John Gibson Gallery in the early 1970s. He was succeeded by Paula Cooper who after Park Place Gallery closed in the late 1960s opened the Paula Cooper Gallery in SoHo. She became a pioneer of the contemporary art scene and a forerunner of the population explosion of art galleries in New York City during the 1970s.

History

Precursors 

In the early 1960s, artists from all over the country moved to Lower Manhattan's lofts and warehouse buildings, in what used to be known as "Hells Hundred Acres", which became large and inexpensive studios. Dealers and gallery owners opened new gallery spaces nearby.

By 1966, SoHo was a growing artist community, and Park Place Gallery became a meeting ground for artists. Especially crowded and popular were the music performances and other special programs hosted by the gallery. During the mid-to-late 1960s and the early 1970s Max's Kansas City on Park Avenue South between 17th and 18th Streets and the St. Adrian's bar on lower Broadway became hangouts for young artists, writers, poets, and creative people in downtown Manhattan.

Early Park Place Gallery 
The first location of the gallery was at near Park Place in Lower Manhattan. The Park Place Gallery was founded in 1962 as a cooperative art gallery by 10 artists, including Mark di Suvero, Dean Fleming, Robert Grosvenor, Forrest Myers, Peter Forakis, Leo Valledor, Tamara Melcher, Tony Magar, and Edwin Ruda. The first director of the space was John Gibson (1933–2019; later of John Gibson Gallery). Later artists to join the cooperative community included David Novros, John Baldwin, and Gay Glading.

The gallery showcased works by younger, less established artists with an emphasis on Geometric abstraction, shaped canvas, Hard-edge painting, Op Art, paradoxical geometric objects, sculpture, and experimental art. Many of the sculptors, painters and other artists who exhibited in Park Place Gallery were interested in cutting edge architecture, electronic music, and minimal art.

Later history 
In 1965, the gallery moved to 542 West Broadway, on what is now LaGuardia Place just north of Houston Street adjacent to the neighborhood that is now called, SoHo. By 1965, Paula Cooper served as director, and Park Place became a lightning rod of attention for the downtown art scene. It became a center for the downtown avant-garde as well, with weekly poetry readings, concerts by new electronic composers, and openings that always drew large crowds of young artists. They had attracted funding from the Lannan Foundation.

Closure and legacy 
By 1967, the gallery had closed.

In the late 1960s and early 1970s in New York City, art shattered into many directions: Conceptual Art, Earth Art, Lyrical Abstraction, Minimal Art, Postminimalism, Performance art, and the continuation of Abstract expressionism, Color field painting, Op Art and Pop Art. A significant development in the New York art scene was the birth of the gallery scene in SoHo, which Park Place Gallery helped define. After the closure of the gallery, director Paula Cooper took many of the experience she had at the Park Place Gallery and used that to open the Paula Cooper Gallery on 96 Prince Street in SoHo. 

In September 2008, the Blanton Museum of Art at the University of Texas at Austin presented an exhibition entitled: Reimagining Space: The Park Place Gallery Group in 1960s New York curated by Linda Dalrymple Henderson. The exhibition ran from September 28, 2008 – January 18, 2009.

Artists 
Many of the artists that were affiliated with the gallery have been nicknamed, The Park Place Group. The Park Place Gallery had exhibited the works of lesser known young and older artists, often for the first time.

Founders 
The Park Place Gallery founders, included:

Exhibitors 
The following artists had exhibited work at Park Place Gallery, including:

See also
Tenth street galleries
Minimal art
Postminimalism
Lyrical Abstraction
shaped canvas
Hard-edge painting
Impossible object
truncated dodecahedron
polyhedron

References

Further reading
Blanton Museum of Art: American Art Since 1900 / editors, Annette DiMeo Carlozzi and Kelly Baum, published by the University of Texas at Austin, 2006, catalog of the collection .
Blanton Museum catalog of the collection: (above) 
Lyrical Abstraction, online essay by Ronnie Landfield,

External links
 Park Place Gallery artists films, 1967, Archives of American Art, Smithsonian Institution
Art and Space: Park Place and the beginning of the Paula Cooper Gallery, Archives of American Art, Smithsonian Institution

1963 establishments in New York City
1968 disestablishments in New York (state)
Contemporary art galleries in the United States
Cultural history of New York City
Artist cooperatives in the United States
Defunct art museums and galleries in Manhattan
Art galleries established in 1963
Art galleries disestablished in 1968